Stanisław Kostka (1475–1555) was a Polish noble, adviser to King Sigismund I the Old and King Sigismund II Augustus I.

He had ten children with his consort Elżbieta z Eilemberku, including Elzbieta Mortęska, Krystyna Działyńska, Anna Konopacka, Barbara Bystram, Katarzyna Niemojewska, Małgorzata Służewska, Stanislaw Kostka, Andrzej Kostka, Jan Kostka, Krzysztof Kostka

He was a courtier, Podskarbi of Ducal Prussia since 1531, castellan of Elbląg since 1544 and Chełmno since 1545, voivode of the Pomeranian Voivodeship since 1546 and of Chełmno Voivodeship since 1551.

He participated in the Polish–Teutonic war of 1519–1520.

1475 births
1555 deaths
Stanislaw